Boheoja is a Korean court music repertoire originated from China. It was introduced from Song Dynasty during Goryeo Dynasty period which at the time was ruled by King Yejong.

Categorized as sa (詩; poetry), the repertoire is poetry based-musical orchestra. Introduced collectively with another Chinese piece called Nakyangchun (Spring In Luoyang), Bohoja now is only preserved in Korea and vanished in China. There are 2 versions of Boheoja: Boheosa, version played by combination of wind and string instruments. Boheosa is an original version with 7 stanzas and 82 melodic lines. The second version is Boheoja which have been shortened with only 3 stanzas and 29 melodic lines. In Goryeo and Joseon Dynasty, Boheoja was played as accompaniment of banquets and dances. Instruments used in Boheoja are dangpiri (Chinese piri), janggu (hourglass-shaped drum), daegeum (large bamboo flute), dangjeok (small Chinese flute), haegeum (2 stringed fiddle), jwago (seated-drum), ajaeng (bowed-zither), pyeonjong (metal bells), and pyeongyeong (stone bells).

References

Korean traditional music